Chalybea minor is a species of plant in the family Melastomataceae. It is endemic to Boyacá and Santander in Colombia.

References

minor
Endemic flora of Colombia
Endangered plants
Taxonomy articles created by Polbot